The Canaan Baptist Church is a historic church at the junction of Laurel and 10th Streets in Texarkana, Arkansas.  The single-story brick church was built in 1929 for an African-American congregation established in 1883.  The building was designed by S. C. Cox, and exhibits Colonial Revival styling with some Gothic details, primarily in its pointed-arch windows.

The church was listed on the National Register of Historic Places in 1990.

See also
National Register of Historic Places listings in Miller County, Arkansas

References

Baptist churches in Arkansas
Buildings and structures in Texarkana, Arkansas
National Register of Historic Places in Miller County, Arkansas
Churches on the National Register of Historic Places in Arkansas
Colonial Revival architecture in Arkansas
Gothic Revival church buildings in Arkansas